Rotino is a village in the Bitola Municipality of North Macedonia. It used to be part of the former municipality of Capari.

History
A segment of the Roman-era road Via Egnatia is found in the village with the toponym Arnautski Pat, stemming from Arnaut, the Ottoman Turkish rendering for Albanians, and suggests either direct linguistic contact with Albanians or the former presence of an assimilated Albanian community. Rotino is attested in the Ottoman defter of 1467/68 as a village in the vilayet of Manastir. A part of the inhabitants  attested bore typical Albanian anthroponyms, such as Gjon and Gjergj.

Demographics
According to the 2002 census, the village had a total of 113 inhabitants. Ethnic groups in the village include:

Macedonians 113

References

External links
 Visit Macedonia

Villages in Bitola Municipality